Arthrochilus stenophyllus, commonly known as the narrow-leaved elbow orchid, is a flowering plant in the orchid family (Orchidaceae) and is endemic to Tropical North Queensland. It has a rosette of dull green leaves on side growth at its base and up to fifteen pale green, insect-like flowers with dark red to brownish glands on its labellum.

Description
Arthrochilus stenophyllus is a terrestrial, perennial, deciduous, sympodial herb with an underground tuber that produces daughter tubers on the end of root-like stolons. The lateral sepals and petals are turned back against the ovary. Flowering occurs from December to February.

Taxonomy and naming
Arthrochilus stenophyllus was first formally described in 1991 by David Jones from a specimen collected south of Cardwell. The description was published in Australian Orchid Research. The specific epithet (stenophyllus) is derived from the Ancient Greek words stenos meaning "narrow" and phyllon meaning "leaf", referring to the narrow rosette leaves.

Distribution and habitat
The narrow-leaved elbow orchid grows with sedges and shrubs in sparse Melaleuca viridiflora woodland near Cardwell.

Ecology
As with other Arthrochilus orchids, A. stenophyllus is pollinated by male thynnid wasps of the genus Arthrothynnus although the species involved is not known. It also reproduces asexually by producing new tubers.

References 

stenophyllus
Plants described in 1991
Orchids of Queensland